This list of bridges in Luxembourg lists bridges of particular historical, scenic, architectural or engineering interest in Luxembourg. Road and railway bridges, viaducts, aqueducts and footbridges are included.

Historical and architectural interest bridges

Major road and railway bridges

Notes and references 
 

 Others references

See also 

 :lb:Lëscht vun däitsch-lëtzebuergesche Grenzbrécken  - List of German-Luxembourgish border bridges
 :de:Liste der Moselbrücken  - List of bridges over the Moselle
 Transport in Luxembourg
 Rail transport in Luxembourg
 List of motorways in Luxembourg
 Geography of Luxembourg

External links

Further reading 
 

Luxembourg
 
Bridges
Bridges